6.28 may refer to:

 An approximation of Tau, a circle constant equal to 2π (6.283185307179586...)
 June 28, represented in the American date format as 6/28
 Hopfner HV-6/28, a small airliner built in the late 1920s
 Matthew 6:28, a Bible verse